James Brown Meunier (1885 – 30 September 1957) was an English cricketer and footballer who played first-class cricket in two matches for Warwickshire in 1920 and association football for several teams in the Football League.

Sporting career 
Meunier played football for a number of Football League and non-league clubs in the period before the First World War and appeared in Minor Counties cricket for Lincolnshire in 1914. After the war, he played twice for Warwickshire as a right-handed lower-order batsman and right-arm fast bowler, but he was given little opportunity to bowl in either match and his batting was not successful. He later played for Plymouth Cricket Club.

Personal life 
Meunier served as a corporal in the Royal Garrison Artillery during the First World War.

Football career statistics

References

1885 births
1957 deaths
English cricketers
Warwickshire cricketers
Everton F.C. players
Manchester City F.C. players
Stockport County F.C. players
Lincolnshire cricketers
British Army personnel of World War I
People from Poynton
Royal Garrison Artillery soldiers
Association football fullbacks
Southport F.C. players
Lincoln City F.C. players
Hyde United F.C. players
Macclesfield Town F.C. players
English Football League players
English footballers
Military personnel from Cheshire